Alexeyevsky District is an administrative district (raion), one of the thirty-three in Volgograd Oblast, Russia. Municipally, it is incorporated as Alexeyevsky Municipal District. It is located in the northwest of the oblast. Its administrative center is the rural locality (a stanitsa) of Alexeyevskaya. Population:  19,189 (2002 Census);  The population of Alexeyevskaya accounts for 23.1% of the district's population.

People
 Alexandr Kolesov (1922-1994)

References

Notes

Sources

Districts of Volgograd Oblast